Franz Ertl (4 May 1911 – 17 May 1968) was an Austrian international footballer.

References

1911 births
1968 deaths
Association football forwards
Austrian footballers
Austria international footballers
First Vienna FC players